Gotlands Allehanda is a Swedish local newspaper based in Visby, Sweden. It has been in circulation since 1873.

History and profile
Gotlands Allehanda was founded in 1873. The headquarters is in Visby and is published six days per week. Since 1999 the paper has been owned by Norrköpings Tidningar Media AB. The publisher is Gotlands Förenade Tidningstryckerier. The paper is published in tabloid format. It has a conservative political stance.

In 2002 Gotlands Allehanda sold 10,800 copies.

References

External links
 

1873 establishments in Sweden
Mass media in Visby
Daily newspapers published in Sweden
Publications established in 1873
Swedish-language newspapers
Conservatism in Sweden